Frederick William Owen Potts, VC, (18 December 1892 – 2 November 1943), more commonly known as Trooper Fred Potts, was an English recipient of the Victoria Cross, the highest and most prestigious award for gallantry in the face of the enemy that can be awarded to British and Commonwealth forces.

Life
Potts was born and raised on Edgehill Street in the Katesgrove area of Reading.  He first came to public notice in 1913, when he saved five-year-old boy, Charles Rex, from drowning in the River Thames (Rex lived to the age of 87.)

In 1915, Potts was 22 years old, and a private in the 1/1st Berkshire Yeomanry of the British Army. During the Gallipoli Campaign of the First World War, he performed the following deed, for which he was awarded the Victoria Cross.

On 21 August 1915 in the attack on Hill 70, Potts (although wounded in the thigh) remained for over 48 hours under the Turkish trenches with Arthur Andrews, another private from his regiment who was severely wounded and unable to move. (Andrews also came from Reading.) He became known as "the hero with the shovel". He was feted on his return from Gallipoli.

After the war, during which he eventually achieved the rank of lance-corporal, he kept a tailor's shop in his home town. He was a Mason and in 1934 was Master of the Aldermaston Lodge.

Potts died on 2 November 1943 at the age of 50. His grave is at Reading Crematorium, whilst his medals are held by the Imperial War Museum.

Andrews lived until 1980, when he died at the age of 89. In 2009, as the result of the production of a BBC Radio Berkshire documentary on Potts, a reunion occurred between the relatives of the two men at the Imperial War Museum.

In 1967 The Victor children's magazine told the story very graphically on the front and back covers; it used to feature a story of bravery every week. This article has been used by the Memorial Trust to explain the story at local schools as a graphical presentation; being very much "of its time" appealed to children.

Memorial in Reading
During Prime Minister's Questions on 20 January 2010, Martin Salter, Member of Parliament for Reading West, indicated that there were plans to provide a permanent memorial to Trooper Potts. It was announced in May 2014 that the memorial would be sited just outside Forbury Gardens, on the open paved area opposite the Crown Court / The Forbury Hotel.

The Trooper Potts VC Memorial Trust was established to raise the necessary funds to build the memorial in 2010, gaining charitable status in 2012. The trust raised the £150,000 required.

Liverpool sculptor Tom Murphy designed the memorial. The life-sized, cast-bronze sculpture was installed on 2 October 2015.

A roll of honour lists the names of 426 men of The Berkshire Yeomanry who gave their lives in the wars of the twentieth century. They are listed by war, by rank and then alphabetically and at the centre is a quote from John F Kennedy.

Other honours  
Potts was commemorated in September 2013 in the name of a new road, Trooper Potts Way, created during construction of the Reading Station north entrance. It was unveiled on 5 April 2014.

The Government's Commemorative VC Paving Stone was set in the eastern corner of the 1920s War Memorial.  It was unveiled in a small ceremony by Trooper Potts' granddaughter, Anne Ames, at 17:00 on 21 August 2015, the exact centenary of the Berkshire Yeomanry's attack on Scimitar Hill.

On 21 March 2016, Greene King opened a new pub/restaurant along Basingstoke Road, to the south of Reading called The Trooper Potts. It featured two very large displays which tell the story of the rescue and Fred and Arthur's lives. In 2019 the company changed the name to The Victoria Cross in a "rebrand" in an attempt to distance it with some unfortunate behaviour by users, the décor now features information about the VC winners from across Berkshire.

Educational outreach 
In 2011 the trust started to work with the history department of Reading College.  Their students have helped the trust by fundraising, joining the committee and teaching to local primary schools about the First World War, Gallipoli and this local story. In 2013 the Trooper Potts prize for History was introduced at the college, it was awarded for 3 years.

Starting in 2013 the Trust has delivered presentations about this Reading story to local groups including; Business groups lunches, pensioner groups, U3A, WEA, WI, Rotary, Round Table, History of Reading Society, Visits Reading and it continues to do so with a booking in 2021.

The trust delivered Trooper Potts mornings at Katesgrove Primary School, Fred Potts' old school, Southcote Primary School and St Edwards School.  The curators of the Berkshire Yeomanry Museum brought along kit of the period for the children to see / try on.  Shorter events were run at other schools. In 2018 it delivered sessions to Cub and Brownie groups in Ascot and Staines. The outreach work to schools has continued each year at Katesgrove and Southcote Schools with the occasional new school being added.

The Victoria Cross 
The trust commissioned a film of David Callaghan, a former director of Hancocks & Co, the London jewellers which has supplied the VC since it was instituted on 29 January 1856, explaining the history of the Victoria Cross.  This is being used in its educational work.

References

Bibliography

External links

 Berkshire Yeomanry Museum information and photos about Potts
 Potts VC memorial site
 Location of grave and VC medal
 

1892 births
1943 deaths
People from Reading, Berkshire
British Army personnel of World War I
British Gallipoli campaign recipients of the Victoria Cross
British World War I recipients of the Victoria Cross
British Army recipients of the Victoria Cross
Berkshire Yeomanry soldiers
Military personnel from Reading, Berkshire